Yves Van Strydonk De Burkel (30 October 1907 – 28 January 1985) was a Belgian equestrian. He competed in two events at the 1936 Summer Olympics.

References

1907 births
1985 deaths
Belgian male equestrians
Olympic equestrians of Belgium
Equestrians at the 1936 Summer Olympics
Sportspeople from Antwerp